Priscilla Ann Clapp (born 1941) is a United States diplomat who served as Chief of Mission in Burma from July 1999 to August 2002 and was then a senior advisor to the U.S. Institute of Peace and the Asia Society. She is a retired Minister-Counselor in the U.S. Foreign Service.

References

External links
 http://www.nndb.com/lists/236/000069029/
 

1941 births
Living people
Ambassadors of the United States to Myanmar
American women ambassadors
Ambassadors of the United States
21st-century American women